The 2014 Super League Grand Final was the 17th official Grand Final and conclusive and deciding match of Super League XIX. It was held on Saturday 11 October 2014, at Old Trafford, Manchester with a 6pm kick-off time. The game was played between the top two teams from the regular season, St Helens RLFC and Wigan Warriors.

Background

The 2014 Super League season (known as the First Utility Super League XIX due to sponsorship by First Utility) was the 19th season of rugby league football since the Super League format was introduced in 1996. Fourteen teams competed for the League Leaders' Shield over 27 rounds (including the Magic Weekend in Manchester), after which the highest finishing teams will enter the play-offs to compete for a place in the Grand Final and a chance to win the championship and the Super League Trophy.

Route to the Final

St Helens

Wigan

Match details

 Following a fiery opening that started with the kind of big tackles that this derby game has become known for, the game suffered a dramatic twist in only the second minute of the game when Wigan Prop, Ben Flower, became the first and only player to be sent off in a grand final by referee Phil Bentham after he punched Lance Hohaia in the face, thus knocking him out, then as he lay defenceless on the floor, he punched him in the face again.	
This forced Wigan to play 78 minutes with 12-men, causing a switch in the Wigan approach to one of smash-and-grab. A valiant first-half performance by Wigan's 12-men meant they entered the break with a 6–2 lead.
 
Despite further strong defensive displays by the Wigan outfit in the ensuing second-half, Iosia Soliola forced himself over the Wigan try-line in his final appearance in the Red-Vee to put St. Helens ahead, and in control of the game. An admirable, yet desperate display by Wigan, to get themselves back into contention was halted, when Tommy Makinson crashed over for Saints, 12 minutes from time to make the score 14–6, after a precise kick over-the-top of the Wigan defence from Saints stalwart, Paul Wellens. Despite a late Wigan flurry, Makinson's try proved to be the one that sealed the game and the championship for St. Helens, meaning that the Saints claimed their first championship title since 2006, and their sixth overall in the Super League era (St Helens are now equal with Leeds Rhinos for titles since 1996, both have 6 titles).

World Club Series

By winning this match the Saints had qualified for the World Club Series Final, to be played early in the 2015 season against the winners of the 2014 NRL Grand final, the South Sydney Rabbitohs.

See also
Super League XIX

References

External links

Super League Grand Finals
Wigan Warriors matches
St Helens R.F.C. matches
Grand Finals
Super League Grand Final